Ajj Aakhaan Waris Shah Nu (English: "Today I Invoke Waris Shah" or "I Say Unto Waris Shah", Punjabi:  , ਅੱਜ ਆਖਾਂ ਵਾਰਸ ਸ਼ਾਹ ਨੂੰ) is a famous dirge by the renowned Punjabi writer and poet Amrita Pritam (1919-2005) about the horrors of the partition of the Punjab during the 1947 Partition of India. The poem is addressed to the historic Punjabi poet Waris Shah (1722-1798 CE), who had written the most popular version of the Punjabi love tragedy, Heer Ranjha (ਹੀਰ ਰਾਂਝਾ). It appeals to Waris Shah to arise from his grave, record the Punjab's tragedy and turn over a new page in Punjab's history.

Summary 
In the poem the poet invokes Waris Shah, a historic Punjabi poet, who wrote a popular version of Punjabi love tragedy Heer Ranjha. Pritam asks to record and witness the miserable condition of Punjab and its people after partition (1947) and open a new page of his book of love. In the story of Heer Ranjha, Shah narrated the misery of a woman (Heer), but a million of daughters of Punjab, Pritam feels, were crying to Shah.

The fields are lines up with dead bodies, and Chenab is filled with blood. Someone unknown poured poison in the water of the five rivers, and the deadly water is destroying the land. The land, which used to be fertile, is sprouting venom, and the sky has turned red from endless cries and tears.

Lyrics
These are the lyrics of the poem:

In popular culture 
The poem found resonance in both Punjabs - Indian and Pakistani. It featured in the Pakistani Punjabi film, Kartar Singh, where it was performed by Inayat Hussain Bhatti. It is one of the most widely read poems in modern Indian literature.

Pakistani band, Mekaal Hasan Band included a 7-minute, 27 second song "Waris Shah" on their albums Sampooran and Saptak. Javed Bashir was the vocalist. The band also released an animated video for this song, which was directed by Zeeshan Pervaiz.

See also
Indian Poetry

References

Punjabi literature
Indian poems
Partition of India in fiction